Jessica Marie Watkin (born 7 May 1998) is a New Zealand cricketer. She made her Women's Twenty20 International cricket (WT20I) debut for New Zealand against Ireland Women on 6 June 2018. On debut, she and Suzie Bates made the highest partnership for New Zealand Women and the fifth-largest partnership for any team in W2T0Is, scoring an unbeaten 142 runs. She made her Women's One Day International cricket (WODI) debut for New Zealand, also against Ireland Women, on 8 June 2018.

In August 2018, she was awarded a central contract by New Zealand Cricket, following the tours of Ireland and England in the previous months. In October 2018, she was named in New Zealand's squad for the 2018 ICC Women's World Twenty20 tournament in the West Indies.

References

External links
 
 

1998 births
Living people
New Zealand women cricketers
New Zealand women One Day International cricketers
New Zealand women Twenty20 International cricketers
Cricketers from Whanganui
Central Districts Hinds cricketers